The Alexander Hamilton Bridge is an eight-lane steel arch bridge that carries traffic over the Harlem River between the boroughs of Manhattan and the Bronx in New York City.  It connects the Trans-Manhattan Expressway in the Washington Heights section of Manhattan and the Cross-Bronx Expressway, as part of Interstate 95 and U.S. 1. The bridge opened to traffic on January 15, 1963, the same day that the Cross-Bronx Expressway was completed. For 2011, the New York City Department of Transportation, which operates and maintains the bridge, reported an average daily traffic (ADT) volume in both directions of 182,174, having reached a peak ADT of 192,848 in 1990.

Design

History
After the George Washington Bridge to New Jersey was completed in 1931, vehicles traveling between New Jersey and the Bronx would travel over the Washington Bridge, which crosses the Harlem River just north of the present Alexander Hamilton Bridge. The Alexander Hamilton Bridge was planned in the mid-1950s to connect Robert Moses' proposed Trans-Manhattan and Cross-Bronx Expressways and to accommodate the additional traffic resulting from the addition of the six-lane lower level to the George Washington Bridge. With the Interstate designation, 90% of the $21 million in construction costs were covered by the federal government. The bridge opened on January 15, 1963.

Starting in 2009, the bridge underwent a full renovation at an estimated cost of $400 million. While the traffic jams created from the construction had not been as bad as local officials had anticipated, inbound delays at the Hudson River crossings increased after the project began. In July 2014, Governor Andrew Cuomo announced that the bridge renovation was complete.

See also
 
 
 
 
 List of bridges documented by the Historic American Engineering Record in New York (state)

References

External links

New York State Department of Transportation - Alexander Hamilton Bridge Project
NYC Roads: Alexander Hamilton Bridge

Bridge and Tunnel Club pictures of the Alexander Hamilton Bridge
Nautical Chart #12342 NOAA.

Open-spandrel deck arch bridges in the United States
Historic American Engineering Record in New York City
U.S. Route 1
Interstate 95
Bridges completed in 1963
Washington Heights, Manhattan
Bridges in Manhattan
Robert Moses projects
Bridges in the Bronx
Road bridges in New York City
Bridges on the Interstate Highway System
Bridges of the United States Numbered Highway System
Bridges over the Harlem River
Steel bridges in the United States
Morris Heights, Bronx